Pomoriany (Ukrainian: Поморяни) is an urban-type settlement in Zolochiv Raion, Lviv Oblast, Ukraine. It hosts the administration of Pomoriany settlement hromada, one of the hromadas of Ukraine. Population is estimated as 

The first mentions of Pomoriany reach 14th century when the town was transferred to the ownership of ruthenian nobles Svynka. The highest development of the town took place in the 16th -17th centuries. That time Pomoriany was the center of the Calvinist movement, subsequently blasted by the Catholic Church. The town was a prominent center of Ukrainian culture in the early twentieth century. During the Soviet industrialization town devoid of railways and enterprises gradually degraded.

Until the holocaust, Pomoriany had a large Jewish community. In the beginning of the 20th century it had around 1,910 Jews, more than one third of the total population.  Many of the Jews left in the end of the 19th century and after World War I.

References

Villages in Zolochiv Raion, Lviv Oblast